Events from the year 1766 in Wales.

Incumbents
Lord Lieutenant of Anglesey - Sir Nicholas Bayly, 2nd Baronet
Lord Lieutenant of Brecknockshire and Lord Lieutenant of Monmouthshire – Thomas Morgan
Lord Lieutenant of Caernarvonshire - Thomas Wynn
Lord Lieutenant of Cardiganshire – Wilmot Vaughan, 1st Earl of Lisburne
Lord Lieutenant of Carmarthenshire – George Rice
Lord Lieutenant of Denbighshire - Richard Myddelton  
Lord Lieutenant of Flintshire - Sir Roger Mostyn, 5th Baronet 
Lord Lieutenant of Glamorgan – Other Windsor, 4th Earl of Plymouth
Lord Lieutenant of Merionethshire - William Vaughan
Lord Lieutenant of Montgomeryshire – Henry Herbert, 1st Earl of Powis 
Lord Lieutenant of Pembrokeshire – Sir William Owen, 4th Baronet
Lord Lieutenant of Radnorshire – Howell Gwynne (until 12 July); Edward Harley, 4th Earl of Oxford and Earl Mortimer (from 16 July)

Bishop of Bangor – John Egerton
Bishop of Llandaff – John Ewer
Bishop of St Asaph – Richard Newcome
Bishop of St Davids – Samuel Squire (until 7 May); Robert Lowth (from 14 June); Charles Moss (from 30 November)

Events
19 February - Thomas Kymer is granted an Act of Parliament allowing him to construct the Kidwelly and Llanelly Canal.
12 May - Sir Roger Mostyn, 5th Baronet, marries Margaret, daughter of Rev Hugh Wynn and heiress to the Bodysgallen estate.
12 November - John, Lord Mountstuart marries Charlotte Jane, granddaughter of Thomas Windsor, 1st Viscount Windsor.
unknown date - The Welsh-language periodical Yr Awstralydd is launched by William Meirion Evans in Australia.

Arts and literature

New books

English language
Anna Williams - Miscellanies in Prose and Verse

Welsh language
David Jones of Trefriw (ed.) - Cydymaith Diddan
John Roberts (Siôn Robert Lewis) - Drych y Cristion

Music
Elis Roberts - Oliffernes a Jiwdath

Paintings
Richard Wilson - Meleager and Atalanta

Births
March - William Turner, industrialist (died 1853)
10 November - John Jones (Jac Glan-y-gors), satirical poet and radical pamphleteer (died 1821)
6 December - Robert Williams (Robert ap Gwilym Ddu), poet (died 1850)
25 December - Christmas Evans, preacher (died 1838)
unknown date - Martha Llwyd, hymnodist (died 1845)

Deaths
1 January - James Francis Edward Stuart, 77, nominally Prince of Wales from his birth until 1701
19 January - Wilmot Vaughan, 3rd Viscount Lisburne, landowner
30 January - John Jeffreys, 59, politician
June - Evan Edwards, 32, harpist
7 May - Samuel Squire, 51/52, Bishop of St Davids
17 November - Morgan Morgan, 78, Welsh-born American colonist (in America)

References

Wales
Wales